Prosartes lanuginosa is a North American plant species in the lily family with the common names yellow mandarin or yellow fairybells.

Prosartes lanuginosa is native to the Great Smoky Mountains and occurs in many other parts of the Appalachian region from New York to Alabama. Isolated populations occur outside Appalachia, as in the Ozarks of northern Arkansas and in southwestern Ontario.

References

lanuginosa
Flora of the Eastern United States
Flora of the Appalachian Mountains
Flora of the Great Lakes region (North America)
Flora of Ontario
Plants described in 1803
Least concern flora of the United States